Yan Ni (born 10 March 1971 in Xi'an, Shaanxi), born Yan Kaiyan, is a Chinese film and television actress. She works for the Television Art center of the People's Liberation Army Air Force.
Li ranked 54th on Forbes China Celebrity 100 list in 2015.

Biography 
Yan Ni was born in Xi'an, Shaanxi. Yan's parents are ordinary workers, and all her family still live in Xi'an. After high school, she enrolled at a financial college to study accounting. Two years later she succeeded in gaining admission to an art organization of the People's Liberation Army (PLA) in Lanzhou, and then went on to enroll at the PLA's Art School in Beijing.

Yan started acting in 1992. In 1999 she had her first cinematic role, playing Qiqoqiqo Ma in the film Cog and Hen. Yan rose to fame for her role as Tong Xiangyu in My Own Swordsman, an 80 episode TV comedy-drama that tells the story of the happenings in a tavern during the Ming Dynasty. After My Own Swordsman she played secretary Xiang Yunxiu in National Action and played Niu Xianhua in The North Wind. Yan was awarded a Golden Eagle Award in 2010 for her role in The Wind From North.

In 2011 Yan had a supporting role in director Dayyan Eng's bilingual film Inseparable, which starred Oscar-winner Kevin Spacey. The film premiered at the Busan International Film Festival and was released in cinemas in China and other territories worldwide. In 2017 she reunited with her The North Wind co-star Xia Yu and director Dayyan Eng to star in the fantasy/comedy Wished, which debuted at the box office with the highest audience scores across the top four ticketing platforms for local Chinese comedies released that summer.

Yan will next be seen in the 2021 Hong Kong film Reindeer alongside Hu Ge.

Personal life 
Yan has a husband and daughter, who is also an actress.

Filmography

Film

Television series

Accolades

References

External links 
 

Actresses from Xi'an
1971 births
Living people
Actresses from Shaanxi
Chinese television actresses
Chinese film actresses
Chinese voice actresses
20th-century Chinese actresses
21st-century Chinese actresses